Samuel Smith Harrison (1780April 1853) was a member of the U.S. House of Representatives from Pennsylvania.

Biography
Samuel Smith Harrison was born in Virginia in 1780. He studied law, was admitted to the bar and practiced.  He moved to Kittanning, Pennsylvania.  He was elected as a Jacksonian to the Twenty-third and Twenty-fourth Congresses.  He resumed the practice of law and died in Kittanning in 1853.  Interment in Old Kittanning Cemetery.

Sources

The Political Graveyard

Pennsylvania lawyers
1780 births
1853 deaths
Jacksonian members of the United States House of Representatives from Pennsylvania
19th-century American politicians